Chetan Ghimire is a Nepali team striker who currently plays for Nepal Police Club and the Nepal national team.

Club career
Chetan Ghimire joined the Nepal Police Club, which he has spent his entire career. However, in early 2013 he tore his ACL for the second time in his career in a match against Nepal Army Club, and since May 2013 has been considering retirement.

International career
His first major tournament was 2014 AFC Challenge Cup qualification in a game against Northern Mariana Islands, in which he entered the match in the 64th minute. He wears the 44 number jersey for the national team.

References

External links
 

Living people
Nepalese footballers
Nepal international footballers
Association football forwards
People from Janakpur
1988 births
Khas people